KJUG may refer to:

 KJUG-FM, a radio station (106.7 FM) licensed to serve Tulare, California, United States
 KVMI, a radio station (1270 AM) licensed to serve Tulare, California, which held the call sign KJUG from 1989 to 2015